Malatesta Baglioni may refer to:

Malatesta Baglioni (bishop) (1581–1648), Italian Roman Catholic bishop
Malatesta IV Baglioni (1491–1531), Italian condottiero and lord